The 1997 Maryland Terrapins football team represented the University of Maryland in the 1997 NCAA Division I-A football season. In their first season under head coach Ron Vanderlinden, the Terrapins compiled a 2–9 record, finished in seventh place in the Atlantic Coast Conference, and were outscored by their opponents 355 to 161. The team's statistical leaders included Brian Cummings with 1,760 passing yards, LaMont Jordan with 689 rushing yards, and Moises Cruz with 337 receiving yards.

Schedule

References

Maryland
Maryland Terrapins football seasons
Maryland Terrapins football